Ilie Floroiu (born 29 November 1952) is a Romanian former long-distance runner who competed in the 1976 Summer Olympics and in the 1980 Summer Olympics. He was born in Iulia in Izvoarele, Tulcea.

References

1952 births
Living people
People from Tulcea County
Romanian male long-distance runners
Olympic athletes of Romania
Athletes (track and field) at the 1976 Summer Olympics
Athletes (track and field) at the 1980 Summer Olympics
Universiade medalists in athletics (track and field)
Universiade gold medalists for Romania
Medalists at the 1975 Summer Universiade
Medalists at the 1977 Summer Universiade
Medalists at the 1979 Summer Universiade
Presidents of the Romanian Athletics Federation